The Gera tramway network is a network of tramways forming part of the public transport system in Gera, a city in the federal state of Thuringia, Germany.

Opened in 1883, the network is operated by Geraer Verkehrsbetrieb GmbH (GVB), and integrated in the Verkehrsverbund Mittelthüringen (VMT).

Lines 
, the network consisted of the following lines:

During peak times, line 1 operates at 10-minute intervals, line 2 20 minutes, and line 3 Monday-Friday 5 minutes (7½ minutes on holidays), 10 minutes at weekends. Off peak only lines 1 and 3 run at 30-minute intervals. In the evenings only line 3 runs, taking 70 minutes for a return trip.

Rolling stock
The current fleet consists of:

22 KT4D (built in 1981–1983 and 1990)
6 KTNF8 (built in 1990)
12 low-floor trams (built in 2006–2008 by Alstom LHB)

See also
List of town tramway systems in Germany
Trams in Germany

References

Notes

Bibliography

External links
 
 Track plan of the Gera tram system
 
 

Gera
Gera
Transport in Thuringia
Metre gauge railways in Germany
Gera